Eva Jiménez Sanz (born 19 May 1975) is a Spanish former professional tennis player.

Biography
Jiménez competed on the professional tour in the 1990s, reaching a best singles ranking of 180 in the world. At the 1993 Mediterranean Games, Jiménez partnered with Virginia Ruano Pascual to win a bronze medal in the women's doubles event. She was a quarter-finalist at a WTA Tour tournament in Curitiba in 1993 and featured in the qualifying draw of the 1994 US Open.

Following her retirement from professional tennis, Jiménez played at college level in the United States, first at USC and then the University of Miami. She now lives in Madrid.

ITF finals

Singles (1–2)

Doubles (2–2)

References

External links
 
 

1975 births
Living people
Spanish female tennis players
USC Trojans women's tennis players
Miami Hurricanes women's tennis players
Mediterranean Games bronze medalists for Spain
Mediterranean Games medalists in tennis
Competitors at the 1993 Mediterranean Games